Albert W. Clarke (25 December 1916 – 16 June 1944) was an English professional footballer who played as a forward. He scored 39 goals in 84 appearances in the Football League playing for Torquay United, Birmingham and Blackburn Rovers.

Clarke was born in Sheffield, and began his football career with Mexborough Town and Frickley Colliery. Together with Frickley teammate Melvyn Millington, he turned professional with Torquay United of the Third Division South after a successful trial. He spent 16 months with Torquay before moving to First Division club Birmingham in 1936. Before the 1938–39 season he moved again, joining Blackburn Rovers in exchange for Wally Halsall. He averaged a goal every other game for Blackburn, helping them to the Second Division title, before the Football League was suspended on the outbreak of the Second World War. During the war he made guest appearances for Torquay and was a finalist in the 1939–40 War League Cup with Blackburn. He died in 1944 on active service in France with the 12th Battalion, Devonshire Regiment, part of the 6th Airlanding Brigade of the 6th Airborne Division.

References

External links
 Profile at Frickley Athletic Museum website

1916 births
1944 deaths
Footballers from Sheffield
English footballers
Association football forwards
Frickley Athletic F.C. players
Torquay United F.C. players
Birmingham City F.C. players
Blackburn Rovers F.C. players
Mexborough Town F.C. players
English Football League players
British Army personnel killed in World War II
Place of death missing
Devonshire Regiment soldiers
Military personnel from Sheffield